CTBC Business School is a private university located in Annan District, Tainan, Taiwan.

The school offers a range of undergraduate and graduate programs in business, including Bachelor's degrees in Finance, Accounting, Information Management, and International Business, as well as Master's degrees in Finance, Business Administration, and Accounting. It also offers a Doctorate in Finance program.

History
The college was originally established in August 2000 as Hsing-Kuo University. In June 2015, the CTBC Financial Holding took over the funding and management of the college and the school was renamed to CTBC Business School.

Faculty
 Department of Banking and Finance
 Department of Business Administration
 Department of Business and Economic Law
Department of Artificial Intelligence
Undergraduate Program of Financial Management College
LL.M. Business and Economic Law
Graduate School of Financial Management

Partner institutions

Asia

North and South America

Europe

See also
 List of universities in Taiwan

References

External links
 

2000 establishments in Taiwan
Educational institutions established in 2000
Universities and colleges in Tainan
Technical universities and colleges in Taiwan